The 1903–04 season was the eleventh season in which Dundee competed at a Scottish national level, playing in Division One, where they would finish in 5th place. Dundee would also compete in the Scottish Cup, where they would progress to the quarter-finals and take eventual champions Celtic to two replays before being defeated. This would be the first season where Dundee would wear their now common look of navy shirts, white shorts and navy socks.

Scottish Division One 

Statistics provided by Dee Archive

League table

Scottish Cup 

Statistics provided by Dee Archive

Player Statistics 
Statistics provided by Dee Archive

|}

See also 

 List of Dundee F.C. seasons

References 

 

Dundee F.C. seasons
Dundee